Joris van Gool (born 4 April 1998, Tilburg) is a Dutch sprinter. He won a bronze medal at the 2019 European Indoor Championships. He also represented his country at 2018 European Championships without advancing from the first round.

International competitions

1Did not finish in the final
2Disqualified in the final

Personal bests
Outdoor
100 metres – 10.16 (-2.0 m/s, La Chaux-de-Fonds 2019)
200 metres – 21.51 (-1.7 m/s, Amsterdam 2016)

Indoor
60 metres – 6.58 NR (Dortmund 2021)

References

External links

Official site

1998 births
Living people
Dutch male sprinters
Sportspeople from Tilburg
Athletes (track and field) at the 2020 Summer Olympics
Olympic athletes of the Netherlands